Polyacanthia stictica is a species of beetle in the family Cerambycidae. It was described by Henry Walter Bates in 1874, originally under the genus Poecilippe.

References

Pogonocherini
Beetles described in 1874